Swedish Ingria (‘land of Ingrians’) was a dominion of the Swedish Empire from 1583 to 1595 and then again from 1617 to 1721, when it was ceded to the Russian Empire in the Treaty of Nystad.

History
Ingria was ceded to Sweden by Russia together with the County of Kexholm by the Treaty of Stolbovo in 1617. It consisted of the area along the basin of the river Neva, between the Gulf of Finland, the Narva River, Lake Peipsi in South-West, and Lake Ladoga in North-East. Bordering to Kexholm and Swedish Karelia by the Sestra (Rajajoki /Systerbäck) river in North-West.

Ingria fell to Sweden in the 1580s, was returned to Russia by the Treaty of Teusina (1595), and again ceded to Sweden in the Treaty of Stolbovo (1617). Sweden's interest of the territory was strategic: as a buffer zone against Russian attacks on the Karelian Isthmus and present-day Finland; and Russian trade was to pass through Swedish territory. In addition, Ingria became the destination for Swedish deportees.

Ingria remained sparsely populated. In 1664 the population was counted to 15,000. Swedish attempts to introduce Lutheranism were met with repugnance by the Orthodox peasantry obliged to attend Lutheran services; converts were promised grants and tax reductions, but Lutheran gains were most of all due to voluntary resettlements from Savonia and  Karelia. Ingria was enfeoffed to noble military and state officials, bringing their own Lutheran servants and workmen. The inhabitants of Ingria have always been Finnic with Finnic culture and language.

Nyen became the trading centre of Ingria, and in 1642 was made its administrative centre. In 1656 a Russian attack badly damaged the town, and the administrative centre was moved to Narva in neighbouring Swedish Estonia.

In the early 18th century the area was reconquered by Russia in the Great Northern War after a century in Swedish possession. The new Russian capital, Saint Petersburg, was founded on the site of the Swedish town Nyen (Finnish Nevanlinna, meaning Castle of Neva) in 1703. This territory, close to the Neva river's estuary at the Gulf of Finland, is now part of Leningrad Oblast, Russia.

Governors-General

Stadtholder 
Samuel Nilsson till Hässle (1601–1607)
Filip von Scheiding (1607–1613)
Evert Karlsson Horn af Kanckas (1613–1615)
Anders Eriksson Hästehufvud (1615–1617)
Ingrian Governors (Narva, Ivangorod, Jaama, Koporje and Nöteborg)
Carl Carlsson Gyllenhielm (1617–1620)
Henrik Klasson Fleming (1620–1622)
Anders Eriksson Hästehufvud (1622–1626)
Nils Assersson Mannersköld (1626–1629)
Heinrich Matthias von Thurn (1629)
Ingrian and Livonian Governors-General
Johan Skytte (1629–1634)
Bengt Bengtsson Oxenstierna (1634–1643)
Ingrian and county of Kexholm Governors-General
Erik Carlsson Gyllenstierna (1642–1645)
Carl Mörner (1645–1651)
Erik Stenbock (1651–1654)
Gustaf Evertsson Horn (1654–1657)
Krister Klasson Horn af Åminne (1657–1659)
Simon Grundel-Helmfelt (1659–1664)
Jacob Johan Taube (Kudina mõisast) (1664–1668)
Simon Grundel-Helmfelt (1668–1673)
Jacob Johan Taube (1673–1678)
Gustaf Adam Banér (1678)
Jacob Johan Taube (1678–1681)
Ingrian Governors
Martin Schultz von Ascheraden (1681–1682) 
Hans von Fersen the older (1682–1683) 
Göran von Sperling (1683–1687)
Ingrian Governors-General
Göran von Sperling (1687–1691)
Otto Wilhelm von Fersen (1691–1698)
Otto Vellingk (1698–1703)

See also
dominium maris baltici
Nöteborg Fortress
Nyenschantz
Ingria

References

States and territories disestablished in 1721
States and territories established in 1583
Ingria
Ingria

et:Ingerimaa kubermang